Fabius Dorsennus (also spelled Dossennus or Dossenus) was a thespian and author of Atellan Farce in Ancient Rome, known for his careless performances. According to Seneca his epitaph was: "Halt, stranger, and understand Dossennus' wisdom".

Description

There is some confusion regarding this figure from ancient Roman theater.  In one of his epistles, Horace mentions a Dossennus:

Pliny the Elder, however, refers to a Fabius Dossennus as the author of "Acharistio," one of the Atellanae Fabulae, in his Natural History. Pliny writes:

Other uses

Dossennus was also the name of a stock character of the Atellanae Fabulae, perhaps named after Fabius Dorsennus.

References

Sources
 Pliny the Elder, Natural History, Book XIV (Original text)
 Pliny the Elder, Natural History, Book XIV (English translation)
 History of Roman Literature (1877)
 Meyer, Maurice, Études sur le théâtre latin

1st-century BC Romans
1st-century BC writers
Ancient Roman comic dramatists
Fabii